The 2011 season was the Kansas City Chiefs' 42nd in the National Football League (NFL), their 52nd overall and their third under the head coach/general manager tandem of Todd Haley and Scott Pioli. A 10–6 record in their 2010 season lent high expectations to their 2011 season, but the Chiefs suffered reversed fortunes. A season-ending hand injury to their starting quarterback Matt Cassel in their eighth game of the season proved especially significant. After a 4–4 record with Cassel at the helm, the Chiefs staggered to a 7–9 win–loss record by season end and failed to make the playoffs.

The Chiefs training camp began on July 29 in St. Joseph, MO. The Chiefs played their first preseason game on August 12 against the Tampa Bay Buccaneers. On September 11, the Chiefs opened their regular season against the Buffalo Bills. They did not earn their first win until Week 4 against the Minnesota Vikings. After starting the season 5–8, head coach Todd Haley was fired after a 37–10 loss to the New York Jets. Haley was replaced by defensive coordinator Romeo Crennel on an interim basis for the remainder of the season. Haley became the second Chiefs coach to be fired during a season; the first was Paul Wiggin in 1977.

One bright spot of the season is the first game after Crennel took over as interim head coach. The Chiefs achieved an upset win against the then 13–0 Green Bay Packers to ruin their perfect season hopes; that loss would prove to be the only one the 2011 Packers suffered in their 15–1 regular season record.

Offseason

Coaching changes

Free agency

2011 draft board

 The Chiefs traded their original first-round selection (#21) to the Cleveland Browns in exchange for the first-round selection (#27) which the Browns had previously acquired from Atlanta, and Cleveland's third-round selection (#70 overall).
 The Baltimore Ravens originally held the 26th pick, but they did not submit their pick in the allotted ten minutes which allowed Kansas City to pick ahead of them.
 The Chiefs traded their original sixth-round selection (#187 overall) and DT Alex Magee to the Tampa Bay Buccaneers in exchange for the fifth-round selection which the Buccaneers had previously acquired from Denver.
 The Chiefs swapped fifth-round selections with the Detroit Lions (the Chiefs originally held the #154 overall selection), after the Lions were found guilty of tampering with Chiefs' players.
 Compensatory selection.

Preseason

Regular season

Schedule

Note: Intra-division opponents are in bold text.

Game summaries

Week 1: vs. Buffalo Bills

Week 2: at Detroit Lions

Week 3: at San Diego Chargers

Week 4: vs. Minnesota Vikings

Week 5: at Indianapolis Colts

Week 7: at Oakland Raiders

Week 8: vs. San Diego Chargers

Week 9: vs. Miami Dolphins

Week 10: vs. Denver Broncos

Week 11: at New England Patriots

Week 12: vs. Pittsburgh Steelers

Hoping to snap a three-game losing streak, the Chiefs went home for a Week 12 Sunday night duel with the Pittsburgh Steelers. Kansas City delivered the game's first punch in the opening quarter with a 41-yard field goal from kicker Ryan Succop. The Steelers would answer in the second quarter with kicker Shaun Suisham getting a 21-yard field goal, followed by quarterback Ben Roethlisberger completing a 2-yard touchdown pass to tight end Weslye Saunders. The Chiefs would reply with a 49-yard field goal from Succop, but Pittsburgh would close out the half with Suisham booting a 49-yard field goal. After a scoreless third quarter, Kansas City began to chip away at their deficit in the fourth quarter with a 40-yard field goal from Succop. However, the Steelers' defense held on to preserve the win.

With the loss, the Chiefs fell to 4–7.

Week 13: at Chicago Bears

Week 14: at New York Jets

The Jets won easily in a crushing rout, with the final score overstating the closeness of the game as the Chief's only touchdown came in garbage time after the game was already decided. The Chiefs offense gained only 4 total yards in the first two quarters. The Chiefs were also plagued with penalties, finishing the game with 11 penalties total. The Jets' final touchdown drive in the third quarter proved to be a particularly humiliating stretch. Starting from their own 10 yard line, the Jets gained 81 penalty yards on 5 penalties committed by the Chiefs, including a rare penalty directly assessed against head coach Todd Haley for unsportsmanlike conduct. The Jets offense gained only 9 net yards on the drive, however they were still able to score a touchdown. After the game, Haley was fired mid-season; writers speculated that Haley's penalty, as well as the team's overall poor performance and discipline that game, was to blame.

Week 15: vs. Green Bay Packers

In one of the biggest upsets of the year, the Chiefs beat the heavily favored Green Bay Packers, ending their hopes of a perfect season. The Chiefs defense held Packers quarterback Aaron Rodgers to 235 yards, a 49% completion percentage, and his only game of the season without multiple passing touchdowns in what was Rodgers' worst game statistically of the season.

The game was the first game coached by defensive coordinator Romeo Crennel, who served as interim head coach after Haley's departure.

Week 16: vs. Oakland Raiders

Week 17: at Denver Broncos

Standings

Division

Conference

Staff

Final roster

Notes and references

Kansas City
Kansas City Chiefs seasons
2011 in sports in Missouri